Johanna Freysinger (born 1 March 1962) is an Austrian former cyclist. She won the Austrian National Road Race Championships in 1997.

References

External links
 

1962 births
Living people
Austrian female cyclists
Place of birth missing (living people)